Pak Myong-song (born 31 March 1994) is a North Korean footballer who currently plays as a defender for April 25 SC.

Career statistics

International

References

External links
 

1994 births
Living people
North Korean footballers
North Korea international footballers
North Korea youth international footballers
Association football defenders
Sobaeksu Sports Club players
April 25 Sports Club players